Illa may refer to:

 Illa, France
 Illa (Arabic), a negative Arabic word
 Illa (surname), a surname
 Independent Labor League of America, an American communist movement
 Illa (moth) a geometrid moth in the tribe Nacophorini
 Illa a synonym for the fly genus Solomonilla

See also

 Alla (disambiguation)
 Ila (disambiguation)
 Illah (disambiguation)